The 1992–93 Minnesota North Stars season was the North Stars' 26th and final season of the franchise in Minnesota. The team finished in fifth place in the Norris Division, with 82 points (three behind St. Louis), missing the playoffs. Four North Stars (Russ Courtnall, Ulf Dahlen, Dave Gagner and Mike Modano) reached the 30-goal plateau.

Offseason

NHL Draft

Regular season

Bobby Smith retired after the season.

Final standings

Schedule and results

Player statistics

Forwards
Note: GP = Games played; G = Goals; A = Assists; Pts = Points; PIM = Penalty minutes

Defencemen
Note: GP = Games played; G = Goals; A = Assists; Pts = Points; PIM = Penalty minutes

Goaltending
Note: GP = Games played; W = Wins; L = Losses; T = Ties; SO = Shutouts; GAA = Goals against average

Awards and honors

Relocation to Dallas
In 1993, amid further attendance woes and bitter personal controversy, North Stars owner Norm Green obtained permission to move the team to the Reunion Arena in Dallas, Texas, where they were renamed, 'specifically', the Stars. The NHL, to quell the controversy, 'promised' to the fans of Minnesota to return in the future with a new franchise.  That promise came true when the franchise was awarded in 1997 and began play in 2000.

References
 North Stars on Hockey Database

Minn
Minn
Minnesota North Stars seasons
1992 in sports in Minnesota
1993 in sports in Minnesota